Mats Rådberg (8 June 1948 – 27 June 2020) was a Swedish country singer, guitarist, composer and architect scoring several chart successes in Sweden during the 1970s/80s. He is well known for working together with the country band Rankarna under the name Mats Rådberg & Rankarna. He also participated at Melodifestivalen 1977 with the song "Du och jag och sommaren", written by Tomas Ledin, which ended up 10th.

Rådberg also acted as a background singer behind Chips at Melodifestivalen 1980. In 1980, he released the album I'm the Singer, You're the Song together with Elisabeth Andreasson, and in 1983 he scored a hit with the song Peta in en pinne i brasan, a Swedish-language version of Shel Silverstein's Put Another Log on the Fire.

Discography

Albums
1969 – Country Our Way (Rank Strangers)
1969 – Early Morning Rain (Rank Strangers; same as Country Our Way, released in Canada)
1970 – Rank Strangers (featuring Mats Rådberg) 
1970 – Well Known Strangers (Mats Rådberg & Rankarna)
1975 – På egen hand  
1975 – We Weren't Born in Tennessee (Mats Rådberg & Rankarna)
1976 – Min musik
1976 – The Best of Mats Rådberg
1977 – Mats Rådberg 
1978 – Boogie 
1979 – Det handlar om känslor
1980 – Mina bästa låtar
1980 – I'm the Singer, You're the Song
1980 – Some Broken Hearts Never Mend 
1982 – Mamma, låt inte din grabb växa upp och bli en cowboy 
1983 – Take Me to the Country
1984 – Familjens Svarta Får
1987 – Country Cookin'
1988 – Jag ger dig min morgon 
1996 – When We Were Young
2002 – 100% Mats Rådberg & Rankarna
2014 – Nashville

References

External links
Rankarna.se
 

1948 births
2020 deaths
Swedish guitarists
Male guitarists
Swedish male singers
Swedish country singers
Singers from Stockholm